Marty McKenzie is an Australian former rugby league footballer who played professionally for the Parramatta Eels and Adelaide Rams.

Playing career
McKenzie made his debut for the Parramatta Eels in 1994 and he went on to play three seasons for the club. In 1997, McKenzie joined the new Adelaide Rams franchise and was part of their inaugural match.

In 1999 McKenzie signed with the London Broncos however he suffered a back injury that required surgery and was sent home without having played a match. McKenzie was replaced at the Broncos by Anthony Seibold.

References

1972 births
Living people
Australian rugby league players
Adelaide Rams players
Parramatta Eels players
Rugby league players from Queensland
Rugby league props